Double Diamond Burton Pale Ale is an English pale ale, first brewed in 1876 by Samuel Allsopp & Sons. It was one of the highest selling beers in the United Kingdom in the 1950s, 1960s and 1970s.

History
Samuel Allsopp & Sons of Burton upon Trent first brewed Double Diamond in 1876 as an India Pale Ale.  Allsopp merged with Ind Coope in 1935. Bottled Double Diamond began to be advertised heavily from 1946, becoming one of four nationally distributed beers by the 1950s. Under reciprocal trading agreements Ind Coope would agree to stock a rival brewer's beer if they replaced their supply of Bass or Worthington with Double Diamond. The keg version was launched in the 1960s. In the 1970s, it was advertised heavily by Ind Coope, especially on TV, with the tagline: "A Double Diamond works wonders".

Carlsberg UK discontinued off-trade sales in 2003, although it continues as a keg beer. It has been alleged that small scale production of the bottled variant continued as it was Prince Philip's favourite beer, with Paul Burrell attesting that Philip drank a small bottle nightly. The keg version is currently known as Double Diamond Pale and is 2.8% ABV. Ind Coope Burton Ale (4.5% ABV), a cask conditioned version of bottled Double Diamond first brewed in 1976, is currently produced by Carlsberg UK.

References

Beer in England
1876 introductions